Serbia participated in the 2010 Summer Youth Olympics in Singapore.

Medalists

Olympic Committee of Serbia has declared medalists for the best young athletes in 2010. Stjepanović received the award for best young athlete and basketball players for the best youth team.

Athletics

Girls
Track and Road Events

Field Events

Basketball

Boys

Cycling

Cross Country

Time Trial

BMX

Road Race

Overall

 * Received -5 for finishing road race with all three racers

Judo

Individual

Team

Rowing

Swimming

Tennis

Singles

Doubles

Volleyball

References

http://www.channelnewsasia.com/stories/sportsnews/view/1075685/1/.html

External links
Competitors List: Serbia

Nations at the 2010 Summer Youth Olympics
2010
Summer Youth Olympics